Petar Čočoroski (Anglicized: Petar Chochoroski; ; born March 18, 1983), is a Macedonian basketball coach. He serves as a head coach for the Crn Drim of the Macedonian First League.

Coaching career 
Čočoroski was a head coach for the Macedonian Second League club Crn Drim from Struga for two seasons (2013–2015). In 2016, he was hired to be the head coach of the AV Ohrid.

National team 
Čočoroski was a part of coaching staff for the Macedonia men's national U-16 team at 2015 FIBA Europe Under-16 Division B Championship.

References

External links
 Cocoroski ABA League Profile
 Coach Profile at eurobasket.com

1983 births
Living people
Macedonian basketball coaches
Sportspeople from Belgrade